Núria de Gispert i Català (born 6 April 1949) is a Spanish politician and lawyer. Between 2010 and 2015 she served as speaker of Parliament of Catalonia.

Biography 
Núria de Gispert is married and has four children. She is also the daughter of politician and lawyer Ignasi de Gispert i Jordà, and greatgrandaughter of Dorotea de Chopitea, protector and benefactor of several Catholic orders. De Gispert graduated in law at the University of Barcelona and she has also the title of legal translator from Ministry of Foreign Affairs and Cooperation of Spain. She worked as lawyer from 
1971 to 1973. She started to work as civil servant at the Diputació de Barcelona in 1974; later, in 1980, she was moved to the Generalitat.

In recognition of her task as lawyer, he was awarded the Cross of St. Raymond of Peñafort (1998), the Cross of Merit to the Service of the Spanish Advocacy (2002) and the Medal of the Bar Association of Barcelona (2004). She is also a member of the Academy of Jurisprudence and Legislation of Catalonia since 2006.

Speaker of the Parliament 
On 16 December 2010, she was elected President (speaker) of the Parliament of Catalonia in the constitutive session of the Parliament for the ninth legislature, being the first woman to hold this position in Catalonia. At the beginning of the 10th legislature, on 17 December 2012, she was re-elected for this position. Since she didn't run on the 2015 Catalan parliamentary election, she couldn't be re-elected. At the beginning of the 11th legislature, in October 2015, Carme Forcadell, part of the Together for Yes coalition, was elected new President of the Parliament of Catalonia.

Footnotes

External links

 

1949 births
20th-century Spanish lawyers
20th-century Spanish politicians
20th-century Spanish women politicians
21st-century Spanish politicians
21st-century Spanish women politicians
Lawyers from Barcelona
Women lawyers from Catalonia
Democratic Union of Catalonia politicians
Interior ministers of Catalonia
Justice ministers of Catalonia
Living people
Politicians from Barcelona
Presidents of the Parliament of Catalonia
University of Barcelona alumni
Women legislative speakers
20th-century women lawyers
20th-century Spanish women